Rotha Beryl Lintorn Lintorn-Orman (7 February 1895 – 10 March 1935) was the founder of the British Fascisti, the first avowedly fascist movement to appear in British politics.

Early life
Born as Rotha Beryl Lintorn Orman in Kensington, London, she was the daughter of Charles Edward Orman, a major from the Essex Regiment, and his wife, Blanch Lintorn, née Simmons. Her maternal grandfather was Field Marshal Sir Lintorn Simmons. The Orman family would adopt the surname of Lintorn-Orman in 1912.

Rotha Orman, with her friend Nesta Maude, was among the few girls who showed up at the 1909 Crystal Palace Scout Rally wanting to be Scouts which led to the foundation of the Girl Guides. In 1908 they had registered as a Scout troop, using their initials rather than forenames.  In 1911 she was awarded one of the first of the Girl Guides' Silver Fish Awards.

In the First World War, Lintorn-Orman served as a member of the Women's Volunteer Reserve and with the Scottish Women's Hospital Corps. She was decorated for her contribution at the Great Thessaloniki Fire of 1917 but invalided home with malaria.  In 1918 she became head of the British Red Cross Motor School to train drivers in the battlefield.

Fascism
Following Lintorn-Orman's war service, she placed an advertisement in the right-wing journal The Patriot seeking anti-communists. This led to the foundation of the British Fascisti (later the British Fascists) in 1923 as a response to the growing strength of the Labour Party, a source of great anxiety for the virulently anti-Communist Lintorn-Orman. She felt Labour was too prone to advocating class conflict and internationalism, two of her pet hates. 

Financed by her mother Blanch, Lintorn-Orman's party nonetheless struggled due to her preference for remaining within the law and her continuing ties to the fringes of the Conservative Party. Lintorn-Orman was essentially a Tory by inclination but was driven by a strong anti-communism and attached herself to fascism largely because of her admiration for Benito Mussolini and what she saw as his action-based style of politics. The party was subject to a number of schisms, such as when the moderates led by R. B. D. Blakeney defected to the Organisation for the Maintenance of Supplies during the 1926 General Strike or when the more radical members resigned to form the National Fascisti, and ultimately lost members to the Imperial Fascist League and the British Union of Fascists when these groups emerged. Lintorn-Orman wanted nothing to do with the BUF as she considered its leader, Oswald Mosley to be a near-communist and was particularly appalled by his former membership in the Labour Party. The feelings were reciprocated, with Nicholas Mosley (whose father, Oswald Mosley, founded the British Union of Fascists in 1932) would claim that she got the idea to save Britain from communism one day while she was weeding her kitchen garden. Nonetheless, the BF lost much of its membership to Mosley’s party after Neil Francis Hawkins left in favour of the BUF in 1932 after a formal merger was narrowly rejected.

Final years
Lintorn-Orman was dependent on alcohol and drugs, and rumours about her sexual orientatation began to damage her reputation. Eventually her mother stopped funding her after hearing lurid tales of drink, drugs and orgies. Lintorn-Orman was taken ill in 1933 and was sidelined from the British Fascists, as effective control passed to Mrs D. G. Harnett, who sought to breathe new life into the group by seeking to ally it with Ulster loyalism.

Lintorn-Orman died at the age of 40 on 10 March 1935 at Santa Brígida, Las Palmas, in the Canary Islands. By then her organisation was all but defunct. Her body was buried at the English Cemetery in Las Palmas.

Bibliography
"Feminine Fascism": Women in Britain's Fascist Movement by Julie V. Gottlieb (I.B. Tauris, 2000)
"Hurrah for the Blackshirts!": Fascists and Fascism in Britain between the Wars by Martin Pugh (Random House, 2005)

References

External links
National Portrait Gallery pictures

1895 births
1935 deaths
British monarchists
People from Kensington
English fascists
English women in politics
Recipients of the Silver Fish Award
Scottish Women's Hospitals for Foreign Service volunteers